Warrington is a town, borough and unitary authority area of Cheshire, England. The unitary authority contains 18 civil parishes, which are distributed around its periphery. Its central area, including the town, is unparished. This list contains the 141 structures in the unparished area that are designated by English Heritage as listed buildings and included in the National Heritage List for England. Of these, three buildings are listed at Grade I, and ten at Grade II*. The remaining buildings are listed at Grade II. The listed buildings in the civil parishes are included in separate lists.

Key

Buildings

See also

Grade I and II* listed buildings in Warrington, covering the unitary authority

References
Notes

Citations

Sources

Listed buildings in Warrington
Lists of listed buildings in Cheshire